Performance (Quartet) 1979 is a live album by American composer and saxophonist Anthony Braxton recorded in Switzerland in 1979 and released on the hatART label. The album has also been issued as Performance 9/1/79 and Performance for Quartet.

Reception
The Allmusic review awarded the album 3 stars.

Track listing
All compositions by Anthony Braxton.

 "Part I" - 36:48   
 "Part II" - 34:26

Personnel
Anthony Braxton - soprano saxophone, alto saxophone, clarinet, contrabass clarinet
Ray Anderson - trombone, alto trombone, little instruments
John Lindberg - bass
Thurman Barker - percussion, xylophone, gongs

References

Hathut Records live albums
Anthony Braxton live albums
1981 albums